The 2001 BBC bombing was a terrorist attack on the BBC's main news centre within BBC Television Centre, on Wood Lane in the White City area of West London.

History
At 12:27 am (0027 UTC) on Sunday 4 March 2001, the Real IRA, a dissident Irish republican group, detonated a car bomb outside the BBC's main news centre within BBC Television Centre, on Wood Lane in the White City area of West London.

Between ten and twenty pounds of high explosive had been placed in a red taxi, reports by BBC after the bombing reported that it was a black taxi but was later identified as a red taxi. The taxi was purchased on the morning of 3 March in Edmonton, north London, and abandoned yards from the main front door of BBC Television Centre at 11 pm. Police officers were attempting to carry out a controlled explosion on the bomb with a bomb-disposal robot when it went off. Staff had already been evacuated after police received a coded warning that had been given to a London hospital and charity one hour before the explosion. There were no fatalities, though one London Underground worker suffered cuts to his eye caused by glass debris.

BBC cameras caught the moment of the explosion and the resulting damage—which included numerous smashed windows in the front entrance—was seen as day broke.

As the explosion happened just after midnight, some reports of the incident say that it happened on 3 March rather than 4 March.

Conviction
The bomb was part of a Real IRA bombing campaign which would also include the Ealing bombing of 3 August 2001 and an attempted bombing in Birmingham city centre on 3 November 2001. Later in November, three men—Noel Maguire, Robert Hulme, and his brother Aiden Hulme—were arrested in connection with all three bomb attacks. They were convicted at the Old Bailey on 8 April 2003, together with two other men—James McCormack, of County Louth, and John Hannan, of Newtownbutler, County Fermanagh, both of whom had already admitted the charge at an earlier hearing. The Hulme brothers were both jailed for 20 years; Maguire, who the judge said played "a major part in the bombing conspiracy", was sentenced to 22 years; McCormack, who the judge said had played the most serious part of the five, also received 22 years; and Hannan, who was 17 at the time of the incidents, was given 16 years' detention.

References

Real Irish Republican Army actions
2001 crimes in the United Kingdom
2001 in London
Car and truck bombings in London
BBC history
White City, London
March 2001 events in the United Kingdom
Terrorist incidents in London in the 2000s
Attacks by Republicans since the Good Friday Agreement
History of the London Borough of Hammersmith and Fulham
Building bombings in London
Terrorist incidents in the United Kingdom in 2001